The Volmer VJ-22 Sportsman is an American homebuilt amphibious aircraft. The Sportsman is a two-seat high-winged monoplane of wood and fabric construction, with over 100 built by 1993.

Development and design
Volmer Jensen, a successful designer of sailplanes, designed the two-seat amphibious VJ-22 in 1957. The new aircraft, at first called the Chubasco, made its first flight on 22 December 1958.

The VJ-22 is a high-winged monoplane, using the wings from an Aeronca Champion or Chief, with a new flying boat hull of mahogany plywood, waterproofed with fiberglass cloth. The aircraft's single engine, normally a pusher of between 85 hp (63 kW) and 100 hp (75 kW), is mounted on pylons above the wing centre section. The engine can also be mounted in tractor configuration and engines of up to 135 hp (101 kW) have been used successfully. A retractable tailwheel undercarriage is provided. The pilot and passenger sit side by side under an enclosed canopy, and are provided with dual controls.

Operational history

While Jensen attempted unsuccessfully to get the Sportsman built commercially, plans for the VJ-22 were made available to amateur builders, with 889 plans sold and over 100 completed by 1993.

Specifications (85 hp engine)

See also

Notes

References

 Lambert, Mark. Jane's All The World's Aircraft 1993-94. Coulsdon, UK: Jane's Data Division, 1993. .
 Taylor John W. R. Jane's All The World's Aircraft 1976-77. London:Macdonald and Jane's, 1976. .

External links

 Volmer VJ-22 Sportsman page

Amphibious aircraft
1950s United States sport aircraft
Homebuilt aircraft
VJ-22
High-wing aircraft
Single-engined tractor aircraft
Single-engined pusher aircraft
Aircraft first flown in 1958
Flying boats